

Analysts
Bill Adam: (auto racing coverage)
Trev Alberts: College Game Day
James Allen: (Formula One coverage)
Greg Anthony: 2002–2008 (NBA Shootaround and game coverage analyst); now NBA TV analyst
Pete Axthelm: (NFL GameDay and NFL PrimeTime analyst) (deceased)
Dusty Baker: 2006–2007 (Baseball Tonight analyst); now Houston Astros manager
 Stephen Bardo: 2005–2013 College Basketball on ESPN
Jon Beekhuis: (auto racing coverage)
Dick Berggren: (auto racing coverage)
Larry Bowa: 2005 (Baseball Tonight analyst); now Philadelphia Phillies bench coach
Jeff Brantley: (Baseball Tonight and game coverage analyst); now broadcaster for Cincinnati Reds
Tom Brennan: 2005–09 College Basketball on ESPN
 Chris Broussard (2004–2016): (NBA Fastbreak); now FS1 NBA analyst
 Mack Brown (2015–2018): ESPN College Football
Ric Bucher: NBA Fastbreak
Doris Burke: 1990–2017
Rick Carlisle: 2007–2008 (NBA coverage analyst); now Indiana Pacers head coach
 John Clayton (1995–2017): Sunday NFL Countdown and NFL Live (deceased)
Bill Clement: (ESPN National Hockey Night analyst) now on NBC
Beano Cook: 1986–2012 College Game Day (deceased)
Catherine Crier: 2004 Thoroughbred Racing on ESPN analyst/reporter
Stacey Dales: 2002–2008 (men's and women's college basketball analyst) and sideline reporter for college football, college basketball, and the Little League World Series) Now on NFL Network
Derek Daly: (auto racing coverage)
John Davidson: (NHL analyst)
Bob Davie: ESPN2 College Football Saturday Primetime
Hubert Davis: 2005–13 College GameDay
Dave Despain: (auto racing coverage)
Rob Dibble: 1998–2004 (MLB coverage analyst; now with MLB Network Radio)
Trent Dilfer (NFL Analyst)
Chris Economaki: (auto racing coverage) (deceased)
Herm Edwards: (NFL Live and ESPNU College Football)  
Brian Engblom: (NHL analyst and reporter)
Peter Gammons: 1988–2009 (Baseball Tonight) now on MLB Network
Mark Gottfried: College Basketball on ESPN
Mike Gottfried: 1990–2007 Analyst and NCAA commentator
Doug Gottlieb: 2003–2012College Basketball on ESPN, now with CBS Sports
Bob Griese: ESPN College Football
 Merril Hoge (1996–2017): NFL Live and NFL Matchup
 Lou Holtz 2005–2015: ESPN College Football
 Brock Huard: ESPN College Football
Craig James: College Football on ABC and ESPN College Football Thursday Primetime
Dale Jarrett: 2008–2014 (NASCAR on ESPN), now analyst for NASCAR on NBC
 Ron Jaworski (1990–2017): Monday Night Football and NFL Matchup
Avery Johnson: 2008–2010 (NBA Shootaround), former Alabama coach
 Bob Knight 2008–2015: College Basketball on ESPN
 John Kruk (2004–2016): Baseball Tonight
 Ray Lewis 2014–2016: Sunday NFL Countdown and Monday Night Countdown
Paul Maguire: 1998–2008 (college football coverage)
Eric Mangini: 2011–2013 NFL Live
 Matt Millen: 2009–2015 College Football on ABC and Monday Night Countdown
Joe Morgan: 1990–2010 Sunday Night Baseball (deceased)
 J.C. Pearson: ESPN College Football
Andy Petree: 2007–2014 (NASCAR on ESPN), now analyst for Fox Sports
 Digger Phelps: 1993–2014 College Gameday and College GameNight
Steve Phillips: 2005–2009 (Baseball Tonight and MLB coverage)
Bill Raftery: 1980–2010: ESPN College Basketball; now with Fox Sports
J.P. Ricciardi: Baseball Tonight
Paul Silas: NBA analyst
 Chris Spielman: 2001–2016 ESPN College Football
Dave Winfield: Baseball Tonight
Eric Young: Baseball Tonight

Anchors
Jorge Andres: 2011–2015 (Sportscenter, ESPNews, NBA Tonight and Numbers Never Lie); now with NBC Universal
Thea Andrews: 2003–2006 (Cold Pizza (2003–2005), ESPN Hollywood (2005–2006); now co-anchor of The Insider
Steve Berthiaume: 2000–2006, 2007–2012 (SportsCenter and Baseball Tonight); now play-by-play voice of Arizona Diamondbacks
Michelle Bonner: 2005–2012 (SportsCenter, ESPNews and ESPN First Take)
Steve Bunin: 2003–2012 (SportsCenter and ESPNews)
Jay Crawford: 2003–2017 (co-host of Cold Pizza/ESPN First Take and 1st & 10)
Lindsay Czarniak: 2011–2017 (SportsCenter) 
Rich Eisen: 1996–2003 (SportsCenter anchor); now NFL Network anchor
Robert Flores: 2005–2016 (SportsCenter, ESPNews); now with MLB Network
Kevin Frazier: (SportsCenter anchor and NBA Shootaround host); now co-anchor of The Insider and host of The T.Ocho Show
Gayle Gardner: (SportsCenter anchor)
George Grande: (first SportsCenter anchor; now with the Cincinnati Reds)
Greg Gumbel: (SportsCenter anchor and NBA play-by-play); now at CBS Sports
Brett Haber: (SportsCenter anchor); now WUSA (Washington, DC) sports anchor
Mike Hall: 2004–2007 (ESPNU); now at Big Ten Network
Chris Hassel: 2013–2017 (SportsCenter anchor) 
Darren M. Haynes: 2014–2017 (SportsCenter anchor)
Fred Hickman: 2004–2008 (SportsCenter anchor and NBA Shootaround host) (deceased)
Mike Hill: 2004–2013 (ESPNews, Baseball Tonight & NFL Live); now with Fox Sports 1
Kit Hoover: (Cold Pizza co-host and tennis reporter); now with Access Hollywood
Jason Jackson: (SportsCenter anchor and NBA 2Night host)
Dana Jacobson: 2002–2012 (co-host of Cold Pizza/ESPN First Take and 1st & 10; formerly SportsCenter); now with CBS Sports Network and CBS News
Brian Kenny: 1997–2011 (SportsCenter, Friday Night Fights and Top 5 Reasons You Can't Blame); now with the MLB Network
Lisa Kerney: 2014–2018 (Sportscenter anchor)
Craig Kilborn: (SportsCenter anchor)
Michael Kim: 1995–2013 (ESPNews, Mike and Mike in the Morning, and ESPN First Take news anchor)
Kenny Mayne: 1994–2021 (Sunday NFL Countdown, SportsCenter, and horse racing coverage)
Jade McCarthy: 2012–2017 (SportsCenter anchor, NFL Insiders host, and NFL Live host)
Dan Patrick: (SportsCenter anchor, ESPN Radio host, and NBA Countdown host); now NBC Sports host
Bill Pidto: 1993–2008 (ESPNews); now with MSG Network
Betsy Ross: (SportsCenter anchor)
Karie Ross
John Saunders: 1986–2016 (host of The Sports Reporters; former host of NBA Shootaround) (deceased)
Stuart Scott: 1993–2015 (SportsCenter, host of Monday Night Countdown, Teammates, Dream Job and Stump the Schwab) (deceased)
 Jaymee Sire: 2013–2017 (SportsCenter and ESPNews anchor)
 Charley Steiner: (SportsCenter anchor, MLB, ESPN2 College football play-by-play, and boxing host); now with Los Angeles Dodgers
 Adnan Virk: 2010–2019 (Sportscenter anchor ESPN College Football host, and ESPN College Basketball host); now with DAZN 
 Sara Walsh: 2010–2017 (SportsCenter anchor, NFL Insiders host, NFL Live host, and Fantasy Football Now host)
 Steve Weissman: 2010–2015 (SportsCenter and ESPNews); now with NFL Network
 Chris Berman: 1979–2016 (SportsCenter, MLB coverage, Sunday NFL Countdown, and NFL Primetime)
 Jonathan Coachman: 2008–2017 (ESPNews and SportsCenter)
 Bob Ley: 1979–2019 (Outside the Lines and SportsCenter)

Commentators
 Ron Allen: International Polo 2005–2016
 Roy Firestone: (Up Close host and Sunday Night Football)
 Paul Lukas: Uni Watch columnist
 Katie Nolan: 2017–2021 (Host of the Sports? with Katie Nolan podcast and Always Late with Katie Nolan)
 Jim Rome: 2003–2011 (Jim Rome Is Burning) now with CBS Sports Radio
 Howie Schwab: 1987–2013 (Stump the Schwab)
 Bill Simmons: 2001–2015 (ESPN.com and Grantland) now with HBO and The Ringer
 Charissa Thompson: 2012–2013 (Co-host of SportsNation), now with Fox Sports

Play-by-play
Joe Beninati: (NHL coverage play-by-play); currently Washington Capitals NHL on NBC Sports Network play-by-play
Kevin Corke: (SportsCenter anchor); currently White House Correspondent for Fox News Channel
Jim Durham: 1992–2012 (NBA coverage) (Deceased)
Jack Edwards: (NHL coverage, World Cup, Little League World Series, and SportsCenter anchor); now Boston Bruins play-by-play on NESN
Mike Emrick: (NHL play-by-play); former play-by-play on NBC and NHL on NBC Sports Network
Dick Enberg: 2004–2011 (tennis coverage) (Deceased)
Ron Franklin: 1987–2011 (college basketball and football coverage) (Deceased)
Jon Miller: 1990–2010 (Sunday Night Baseball play-by-play) now with the San Francisco Giants
Brent Musburger: 1990–2017 (college basketball and football, and NASCAR coverage; and formerly NBA coverage)
Brad Nessler: 1992–2016 (college football and basketball coverage); now with CBS
Allen Bestwick: (2007–2014) NASCAR coverage (2014–2017) College Football coverage/IndyCar Series coverage
Dave O'Brien: 2002–2017 (Major League Soccer, World Cup  college basketball, football and MLB coverage)
Mike Patrick: 1982–2018 (college basketball, baseball, and American football coverage)

Reporters
David Aldridge: (NBA Shootaround and game coverage reporter); now reporter for TNT and analyst for NBA TV
Erin Andrews: 2004–2012 (college football, basketball and MLB coverage), now with Fox Sports 
Jill Arrington: 2004 (Thursday night college football sideline reporter); now with Fox Sports Net
Jenn Brown: 2010–2013 (College GameDay football and basketball, College World Series and Little League World Series reporter, X Games reporter, ESPNU Road Trip host)
Downtown Julie Brown: (NFL Prime reporter)
Colleen Dominguez: 2004–2014 (SportsCenter reporter); now with Fox Sports 1
Alex Flanagan: 1998–2006 (SportsCenter and college football reporter); now with NFL Network and Notre Dame Football on NBC
Pedro Gomez: 2003–2021 (SportsCenter reporter) (deceased)
Jim Gray: (NBA sideline reporter); now reporter for Sacramento Kings on NBC Sports California
Tony Gwynn: (MLB coverage) (deceased)
Todd Harris: (IRL coverage)
Kaylee Hartung: (college football and basketball coverage), now with CNN
David Hobbs: (auto racing coverage) 
Michael Irvin: 2003–2006 (Sunday NFL Countdown and Monday Night Countdown analyst); now an NFL Network analyst
Ned Jarrett: (auto racing coverage)
Bob Jenkins: (auto racing coverage) now on NBC Sports Network
Parker Johnstone: (auto racing coverage)
Steve "Snapper" Jones: (NBA analyst) (deceased)
Mike Joy: (auto racing coverage) (play-by-play) NASCAR on Fox and Speed and (play-by-play) MLB on Fox
Eric Karros: 2005–2006 (Thursday Night Baseball analyst); now Fox analyst
Adrian Karsten: (College Football sideline reporter)
Ray Knight: (Baseball Tonight analyst); now a Washington Nationals studio analyst on MASN
Andrea Kremer: 1989–2006 (SportsCenter, NFL Countdown, Monday Night Countdown reporter); now reporter for NBC Sports and Real Sports
Bill Laimbeer: 2004–2005 (NBA Shootaround); currently head coach of the Las Vegas Aces of the WNBA
Matt Lauer: (Stanley Cup Finals reporter)
Lee Leonard: (first SportsCenter anchor)
Rush Limbaugh: (NFL Countdown); now hosts The Rush Limbaugh Show (deceased)
Mario Lopez: (ESPN Hollywood); now hosts Extra, MTV's Top Pop Group, and America's Best Dance Crew
Mike Macfarlane: (Baseball Tonight analyst)
Rick Majerus: 2004–2007 (College GameNight and college basketball coverage); (deceased)
Mark Malone: (NFL Matchup and NFL Live host)
Dave Marash: (Baseball Tonight host)
Buck Martinez: 2003–2007 (MLB coverage); now Toronto Blue Jays play-by-play on SportsNet and TBS analyst
Tino Martinez: (Baseball Tonight analyst); now on YES Network
Tim McCormick: (college basketball coverage)
Tom Mees: (SportsCenter, NHL coverage); (deceased)
Gary Miller: 1990–2004 (SportsCenter anchor and MLB game play-by-play and reporter, and Baseball Tonight host)
Anne Montgomery: (SportsCenter, aka Sports Recap)
Al Morganti: 1993–2005 (NHL coverage)
Chris Myers: (SportsCenter anchor, UpClose and Baseball Tonight host); now reporter for Fox Sports NASCAR on Fox pre-race host
Rachel Nichols: 2004–2013 (SportsCenter and E:60 reporter); now with Showtime Sports 
Larry Nuber: (auto racing coverage); (deceased)
Keith Olbermann: (SportsCenter anchor); was original host program with Olbermann on ESPN2 & ESPNEWS
Ed Olczyk: (NHL coverage); now on NHL on NBC Sports Network and NBC analyst
Lou Palmer: (SportsCenter)
Darren Pang: (NHL game and studio analyst, reporter); now analyst for the St. Louis Blues on Bally Sports Midwest
Benny Parsons: (auto racing coverage) former NBC Sports and TNT analyst; deceased
Rick Peckham: (NHL coverage)
Sam Posey: (auto racing coverage)
Jerry Punch: 1984–2017 (NASCAR and college football coverage)
Daryl Reaugh: (NHL coverage)
Dave Revsine: 2002–2007 (College GameNight host and SportsCenter anchor); now with Big Ten Network
Harold Reynolds: 1999–2006 (Baseball Tonight and college baseball coverage); now with MLB Network and Fox Sports
Jimmy Roberts: (SportsCenter reporter); now NBC Sports reporter
Robin Roberts: (SportsCenter anchor and NFL PrimeTime co-host); now a co-anchor on Good Morning America
Sam Rosen: (NHL coverage)
Sam Ryan: (Sunday Night Baseball and NHL reporter); now with WABC-TV in New York City
Lyn St. James: (auto racing coverage)
Sean Salisbury: 1997–2008 (NFL Live); now hosts Inside Sports Unleashed and commentates for Lingerie Football League
Dick Schaap: (The Sports Reporters host); (deceased)
Bill Seward: (SportsCenter and Horse Racing)
Sterling Sharpe: (Sunday NFL Countdown and Monday Night Countdown)
Ralph Sheheen: (auto racing coverage)
Neil Smith: (NHL coverage)
Shannon Spake: 2007–2016 (NASCAR beat reporter and college basketball sideline reporter)
Ken Squier: (auto racing coverage)
Walt Stannard: (F1 coverage 1987)
Jayson Stark: 1999–2017 (Baseball Tonight)
Melissa Stark: (Sunday NFL Countdown and SportsCenter reporter); now hosts First on the Field with NFL Network
Jackie Stewart: (Formula One coverage)
Rob Stone: 1997–present (Major League Soccer)
Steve Stone (MLB coverage); now Chicago White Sox analyst for NBC Sports Chicago
Dave Strader: (NHL and college basketball play-by-play); now with Dallas Stars (deceased)
Michele Tafoya: 2000–2011 (Monday Night Football) now on NBC Sunday Night Football
Joe Theismann: 1987–2007 (NFL GameDay, Sunday Night Football, and Monday Night Football analyst); now commentates for Thursday Night Football, co-hosts Playbook, and is the majority owner of UFL franchise Florida Tuskers
Tom Tolbert: 2002–2007 (NBA Shootaround and game coverage analyst)
Bobby Unser: (auto racing coverage)
Bob Varsha: (auto racing coverage) now on Speed
Lesley Visser: (ABC Sports and ESPN, 1994–2000, Monday Night Football 1997–99); now with CBS Sports
Bill Weber: (auto racing coverage)
Ed Werder: 1998–2017 (SportsCenter reporter)

Past
ESPN